Colonel Sir Robert Andrew St George Martin  (23 April 1914 – 13 December 1993) was a British Army officer who was Lord Lieutenant of Leicestershire from 1965 to 1989.

Robert Andrew St George Martin was educated at Eton and at the Royal Military College, Sandhurst. He was commissioned into the Oxfordshire and Buckinghamshire Light Infantry in 1934. He was Aide-de-camp to the Governor General of South Africa from 1938 to 1940.

Martin served in the Second World War with the 4th Oxfordshire and Buckinghamshire Light Infantry from 1940 to 1942 and the Royal Warwickshire Regiment from 1942 to 1944. He served in North-Western Europe with the 5th Duke of Cornwall Light Infantry during 1944 and 1945 and was mentioned in despatches. Following staff posts he served with the 1st Somerset Light Infantry from 1950 to 1952 and was Assistant Military Secretary at HQ, BAOR from 1952 to 1954. He served with the 1st Oxfordshire and Buckinghamshire Light Infantry, 43rd and 52nd during 1954 and 1955. He was Military Secretary to the Governor General of Australia Field Marshal Lord Slim from 1955 to 1957. Martin commanded the 1st Oxfordshire and Buckinghamshire Light Infantry, 43rd and 52nd and the 1st Green Jackets (43rd and 52nd) in Cyprus from 1957 to 1959. He was Brigade Colonel of the Green Jackets Brigade at Winchester, Hampshire from 1959 to 1962. He commanded Recruiting and Liaison Staff, HQ Western Command from 1962 to 1965. He retired from the Army in 1965.

Martin was Lord Lieutenant of Leicestershire from 1965 to 1989. He lived in Woodhouse Eaves, near Loughborough, Leicestershire. He married Margaret Grace in 1950 with whom he had one son.

He was appointed KCVO in 1988, OBE in 1959 and MBE in 1949.

References

Further reading
Who Was Who 1991-1995 Volume 1X (1996)
Obituary The Daily Telegraph 28 December 1993
Obituary The Times 20 December 1993.

Lord-Lieutenants of Leicestershire
1914 births
1993 deaths
Military personnel from Leicestershire
Oxfordshire and Buckinghamshire Light Infantry officers
People educated at Eton College
Graduates of the Royal Military College, Sandhurst
Royal Warwickshire Fusiliers officers
Duke of Cornwall's Light Infantry officers
Royal Green Jackets officers
British Army personnel of World War II
Knights Commander of the Royal Victorian Order
British military personnel of the Cyprus Emergency
People from the Borough of Charnwood